Mujeres y hombres y viceversa (English: Women and Men and vice versa; MYHYV for short) is a Spanish dating show produced by Magnolia TV. The show aired  on Telecinco since its premiere on 9 June 2008, until it moved to Cuatro on 24 January 2018. The Spanish adaptation of the Italian format Uomini e Donne gained an 18.4% audience share and was the most viewed program among the Spanish audience in its time slot during the first two seasons. The program was hosted by Emma García for 2,613 episodes. In 2018, Toñi Moreno  took on hosting duties. In 2019, Nagore Robles stood in as host during Moreno's maternity leave. In 2020, Jesús Vazquez took on hosting duties.

The show aroused some controversy owing to vulgar language.

The program ended in March 2021 after an extended period of declining ratings.

Format
The show is based on the Italian dating show Uomini & Donne, and it is focused on single persons. The 'tronistas' (from the Spanish/Italian word 'trono', meaning 'throne', because the protagonist is sitting on an imaginary throne) are 4, usually 2 men and 2 women. These are the protagonists, whose aim is to find their soulmate among some admirers. Each day the "tronista" can meet new people, and after a brief presentation of them, he/she can decide to keep dating them or not.

Moreover, the "tronista" will decide the candidates he/she wants to date outside the TV studio; during the date he/she has the possibility to know candidates better. Though, there is a fundamental rule, and both the tronistas and the candidates have to respect: they can meet each other just in front of cameras, never privately. If this rule is not respected, they can be evicted from the show.

When the tronista chooses their soulmate, there are just a few candidates waiting for their decision. He/she also can leave the program alone, if he/she chooses no-one. Consequently, another man/woman replaces him/her on the throne.
Each episode features two tronistas.
When their dates outside the TV studio are broadcast, the audience can listen to some background music (especially Spanish singers like Danny Romero).

References

External links
 

Dating and relationship reality television series
2008 Spanish television series debuts
2021 Spanish television series endings
Obscenity controversies in television